Yarik is a town and union council in Dera Ismail Khan District of Khyber-Pakhtunkhwa. It is located on Indus Highway (N-55) and has an altitude of 185 metres (610 feet). It will be the southern terminus of the Brahma Bahtar-Yarik Motorway.

References

Union councils of Dera Ismail Khan District
Populated places in Dera Ismail Khan District